William John Conybeare (1 August 1815 – 23 July 1857) was an English vicar, essayist and novelist.

Conybeare was the son of Dean William Daniel Conybeare, and was educated at Westminster and at Trinity College, Cambridge, where he was elected fellow in 1837.

From 1842 to 1848 Conybeare was principal of the Liverpool Collegiate Institution (later Liverpool College), which he left for the vicarage of Axminster.

Conybeare published Essays, Ecclesiastical and Social (1855), and a novel, Perversion: or, the Causes and Consequences of Infidelity (1856), but is best known as the joint author (along with John Saul Howson) of The Life and Epistles of St Paul  (1852, 2nd ed. 1856).

Conybeare died at Weybridge, Surrey, in 1857, and is buried in Brompton Cemetery, London.

References

External links
Essays, Ecclesiastical and Social (1855) by W. J. Conybeare at Archive.org
Perversion: or, the Causes and Consequences of Infidelity (1856) by W. J. Conybeare at Archive.org
The Life and Epistles of St Paul (1856) by The Rev. W. J. Conybeare and The Rev. J. S. Howson at Archive.org

1815 births
1857 deaths
People educated at Westminster School, London
Alumni of Trinity College, Cambridge
Fellows of Trinity College, Cambridge
19th-century English Anglican priests
Burials at Brompton Cemetery
English non-fiction writers
19th-century English novelists
English male novelists
19th-century English male writers
English male non-fiction writers